The William E. Martin House is a Prairie style home designed in 1902 by American architect Frank Lloyd Wright in the Chicago suburb of Oak Park, Illinois, United States. W.E. Martin was inspired to commission Wright for a home after he and his brother, Darwin D. Martin drove around Oak Park looking at Wright's homes. After meeting with Wright, William Martin excitedly wrote his brother, "I've been—seen—talked to, admired, one of nature's noblemen—Frank Lloyd Wright."

The wood and stucco home W.E. Martin commissioned has three bedrooms and two bathrooms on three stories (to accomplish the need for space on the size of the lot). The building also included a pergola (since destroyed). 

A visit to the home by brother Darwin persuaded him to commission his home from the architect, and later recommend Wright as the architect of the headquarters for the company Darwin worked for, the Larkin Company.

References

 Storrer, William Allin. The Frank Lloyd Wright Companion. University Of Chicago Press, 2006,  (S.061)

External links
Listing about the W.E. Martin House at the Frank Lloyd Wright Trust
Exterior photographs of W.E. Martin House

Frank Lloyd Wright buildings
Oak Park, Illinois